Elizabeth Avellán Veloz (born November 8, 1960) is a Venezuelan-born American film producer.

Biography 
Avellán was born in Caracas, Venezuela. Her grandfather, Gonzalo Veloz Mancera, created the first privately owned Venezuelan television station, Televisa. As a teenager, she moved together with her family to Houston, United States, where she graduated from Rice University.

She first worked as an administrative associate for Gerhard Fonken, an executive vice president of the University of Texas. In 1994, to prepare for the production of Desperado, she took production classes at UCLA.

She is the current co-owner and vice president of Troublemaker Studios, the production company that she and her former husband, Robert Rodriguez, founded in 2000. Avellán was also executive producer of In and Out of Focus, a documentary about balancing motherhood and a career in the film business.

In September 2019, she bought the remake rights of The Whistler to create an English-language franchise of the movie with her production company Eya Productions. In January 2020, along with Rana Joy Glickman, Elizabeth Avellán Veloz launched the production company Tealhouse Entertainment. The Whistler franchise was to be produced by this new company.

Other roles 

 Member of the Academy of Motion Picture Arts and Sciences

Awards 

 2007: Texas Film Hall of Fame Ann Richards Award

Personal life 
From 1989 to 2007, Elizabeth Avellán Veloz was married to Robert Rodriguez, whom she had met at the University of Texas at Austin in 1988. They had five children together.

Films

References

External links
 

1960 births
Living people
Rice University alumni
Venezuelan emigrants to the United States
People from Houston
Film producers from Texas
American women film producers
People from Caracas